Evandale is a small suburb of Adelaide in the City of Norwood Payneham St Peters. It is bounded on the northwest by Payneham Road and on the east by Portrush Road, with smaller streets bounding the north and south.

References

Suburbs of Adelaide